Rolandas Baravykas (born 23 August 1995) is a Lithuanian professional footballer who plays as a defender for Liga I club Farul Constanța and Lithuania national team.

Club career 
In 2013 Baravykas moved to FK Atlantas and signed 4 years deal. In this period, Rolandas managed to establish himself as a starting 11 player and appeared more than 100 times for his club. He also was invited into Lithuania national team and made his debut in a friendly match against Malta. He also played in various youth teams. After 2016 season he joined FK Žalgiris. After 2019 season he left Žalgiris.

Style of play 
Baravykas is an all-round full-back. His primary position is on the right side, but he also can play on the left.

International career 
In May 2015, Baravykas received his first call-up to the senior Lithuania squad for two matches against Hungary and Malta.

International stats

International goals
Scores and results list Lithuania's goal tally first.

Honours

Club
Atlantas
A Lyga runner-up: 2013
Lithuanian Cup runner-up: 2014–15

Žalgiris
A Lyga runner-up: 2017, 2018, 2019
Lithuanian Cup: 2018
Lithuanian Supercup: 2017

International
Lithuania
Baltic Cup: runner-up 2016

References

External links 
 Rolandas Baravykas at uefa.com
 

1995 births
Living people
Sportspeople from Šiauliai
Lithuanian footballers
Lithuania international footballers
Lithuania under-21 international footballers
Association football fullbacks
A Lyga players
FK Atlantas players
FK Žalgiris players
Cypriot First Division players
Nea Salamis Famagusta FC players
Kategoria Superiore players
FK Kukësi players
Liga I players
FC UTA Arad players
FC Universitatea Cluj players
FCV Farul Constanța players
Lithuanian expatriate footballers
Lithuanian expatriate sportspeople in Cyprus
Expatriate footballers in Cyprus
Expatriate footballers in Albania
Lithuanian expatriate sportspeople in Romania
Expatriate footballers in Romania